Alsodes nodosus (common name: black spiny-chest frog) is a species of frog in the family Alsodidae endemic to central Chile; records from Argentina are not considered valid.

Alsodes nodosus is locally common but is getting rarer. It is found in temperate shrubland and seasonal and permanent streams. It is not tolerant of habitat destruction, and urban sprawl is rapidly destroying suitable habitat.

References

nodosus
Amphibians of Chile
Endemic fauna of Chile
Taxonomy articles created by Polbot
Amphibians described in 1841
Taxa named by André Marie Constant Duméril
Taxa named by Gabriel Bibron